Diary of a Girl in Changi is the diary of Sheila Bruhn (née Allan) and her experiences in Singapore's Changi Prison from 1941 to 1945. It was first published by Kangaroo Press in 1994.

References 

1994 non-fiction books
World War II memoirs
Works about women in war
Diaries
Memoirs of imprisonment